Monika Merva (born 1969) is an American photographer.

Her work is included in the collection of the Museum of Fine Arts Houston, the Worcester Art Museum and the Brooklyn Museum.

References

Living people
1969 births
20th-century American photographers
21st-century American photographers
20th-century American women artists
21st-century American women artists